Gregorian may refer to:

The thought or ideology of Pope Gregory I or Pope Gregory VII (also called Gregorianism)
Things named for Pope Gregory I:
Gregorian chant, the central tradition of Western plainchant, a form of monophonic, unaccompanied sacred song of the western Roman Catholic Church
 Gregorian mass
Brotherhood of Saint Gregory, a community of friars within the Anglican Communion. The community's members, known as "Gregorians", include clergy and laymen. Since 1987 there has also been a parallel order of sisters, the Sisters of Saint Gregory
The Gregorian Reform (Pope Gregory VII), a series of reforms initiated by Pope Gregory VII and the circle he formed in the papal curia, c. 1050–80, which dealt with the moral integrity and independence of the clergy
Things named for Pope Gregory XIII:
Gregorian calendar, internationally the most widely used civil calendar. It is named after Pope Gregory XIII, who introduced it in October 1582
Pontifical Gregorian University, Rome
The Armenian Apostolic Church, sometimes called the Gregorian Church after Saint Gregory the Illuminator
The Gregorian telescope, named after James Gregory
Gregorian (band), German band that performs Gregorian chant-inspired versions of modern pop and rock songs
Gregorian Antiphonary, an early Christian antiphonary, i.e. book of choral music to be sung antiphonally in services; it is associated traditionally with Pope Gregory I
Gregorian Consortium, a collaborative association of three pontifical universities/institutes in Rome
Gregorian Sacramentary, a 10th-century illuminated Latin manuscript containing a sacramentary. Since the 16th century it has been in the Vatican Library as Lat. 3806
Gregorian Tower, a round tower located above the Gallery of Maps, which connects the Villa Belvedere with the Apostolic Palace in Vatican City
 Gregorian (horse)

People 
Arthur T. Gregorian (1909–2003), Greater Boston oriental rug dealer and author of books on oriental rugs, and considered to be the world's leading collector of rare, inscribed Armenian rugs
Hrach Gregorian (born 1950), American political consultant, educator, and writer
Joyce Ballou Gregorian (1946–1991), American author, expert on Oriental rugs, and lover of Arabian horses
Mike Gregorian, American former soccer player who earned one cap with the U.S. national team in 1988
Vartan Gregorian (1934–2021), Iranian-born Armenian-American academic, serving as the president of Carnegie Corporation of New York
Gregorian Bivolaru (born 1952), founder of the Movement for Spiritual Integration into the Absolute (MISA)

Armenian-language surnames